This is a list of South African composers, arranged in alphabetical order.

A
 Darryl Andrews

B
 Michael Blake (born 1951), experimental music composer and Honorary Professor at Stellenbosch University
 Jürgen Bräuninger

C
 Mira Calix, experimental composer
 Hannes Coetzee (born 1944), guitarist and composer
 Andrew Cruickshank (born 1973)

D
 Johnny Dyani

E
 David Earl (born 1951), Classical music composer and concert pianist

F
 Robert Fokkens

G
 Stanley Glasser (born 1926), Modern Classical music composer
 Stefans Grové

H
 Paul Hanmer
 Paul Hepker
 Hendrik Hofmeyr (born 1957), Classical music composer
 David Hönigsberg (1959–2005), Classical music composer

I
 Abdullah Ibrahim

J
 Trevor Jones (born 1949), Classical music orchestral music score composer
 John Joubert (born 1927), Classical music composer

K
 Magogo kaDinuzulu, composer of Zulu classical music
 Peter Klatzow, composer, pianist and Professor Emeritus at University of Cape Town
 David Kramer (born 1951), composer, singer, songwriter, playwright and director
 Andile Khumalo (born 1978), composer, lecturer of music at University of Witwatersrand
 Mzilikazi Khumalo (1932–2021), choral composer, professor emeritus of African languages.

L
 Solomon Linda (1909–1962), Zulu musician, singer and composer
 Clare Loveday

M
 Stephanus Le Roux Marais
 Todd Matshikiza (1921–1968), jazz pianist, composer and journalist
 Lebo Morake (born 1964), movie Soundtrack composer
 Vusi Mahlasela
 Hugh Masekela
 Michael Mosoeu Moerane (1904-1980), choral music composer

N
 Bongani Ndodana-Breen

P
 Taliep Petersen (1950–2006), singer, composer and director

R
 Trevor Rabin (born 1954), contemporary movie soundtrack composer
 Thomas Rajna (1928–2021), modern classical music composer
 Priaulx Rainier (1903–1986)
 Michael Rosenzweig (composer) (born 1951), modern classical music composer
 Surendran Reddy (1962–2010 ), clazz composer

S
 Hilton Schilder (born 1959) pianist
 John Simon (born 1944) 
 Warrick Sony (born 1958), musician, record producer, composer
 Joseph Shabalala (born 1941), composer and founder of Ladysmith Black Mambazo
 Enoch Sontonga (1873–1905), composer of Nkosi Sikelel' iAfrika

T
 Hannes Taljaard (born 1971), classical music composer
 Benjamin Tyamzashe (born 1890), Xhosa music composer

U
 Ernst Ueckermann (born 1954), composer and pianist

V
 Niel van der Watt (born 1962), modern choral and classical music composer
 Arnold van Wyk (1916–1983)
 Kevin Volans (born 1949), composer with the post-minimalist movement
 Dimitri Voudouris (born 1961), electro-acoustic new music composer
 Andre van Rensburg Avant Garde composer, guitarist and shakuhachi player.

Z
 Jeanne Zaidel-Rudolph (born 1948), composer, pianist and teacher
 Zonke Dikana (born 1979), composer, arranger, producer and vocalist

References

South African